The Journal of Zhejiang University Science B: Biomedicine & Biotechnology is a monthly peer-reviewed scientific journal covering  biomedicine, biochemistry, and biotechnology. It was established in 2000 and is published by Zhejiang University Press in collaboration with Springer Science+Business Media. The editors-in-chief are Shu-min Duan and De-nian Ba, both of Zhejiang University.

Abstracting and indexing 
The journal is abstracted and indexed in the Science Citation Index Expanded, The Zoological Record, BIOSIS Previews, Index Medicus/MEDLINE/PubMed, and Scopus. According to Journal Citation Reports, the journal has a 2016 impact factor of 1.676.

References

External links 
 Official website (Springer Nature)
 Official website (Zhejiang University)

Monthly journals
Publications established in 2000
English-language journals
Zhejiang University Press academic journals
Springer Science+Business Media academic journals
Biotechnology journals
General medical journals